A gubernatorial election was held on 20 November 1994 to elect the Governor of ,  who is the southernmost and westernmost prefecture of Japan.

Candidates 

Masahide Ōta, 69, incumbent since 1990, endorsed by OSMP, JSP, JCP, Komeito and JNP.  
Onaga Sukehiro, 58, former vice-governor, backed by LDP.

Results

References 

1994 elections in Japan
Okinawa gubernatorial elections